Turmanidze is a Georgian surname. Notable people with the surname include:
Irakli Turmanidze (born 1984), Georgian weightlifter
Zaza Turmanidze (born 1965), Georgian former wrestler

Surnames of Georgian origin
Georgian-language surnames